Mike Hawker (born June 25, 1956) was a Republican member of the Alaska House of Representatives, representing the 28th District from 2003 to 2017. He served as Chair of the Legislative Council and  the Legislative Budget & Audit Committee. He is former Co-chair of the Finance Committee and Ways and Means Committees. Mike Hawker is also a retired Certified Public Accountant and an Accounting and Management Consultant.



Personal life
Mr. Hawker was born and raised in Manchester, Iowa, graduating from West Delaware High School. He received a Bachelor of Arts in Accounting and Humanities, and his public accountant certification from the University of Northern Iowa in 1979.

Representative Hawker has a wife: Carol Carlson, the daughter of John Carlson, who was mayor of the Fairbanks North Star Borough from 1968 to 1982.

References

External links
 Alaska State House Majority Site
 Alaska State Legislature Biography
 Project Vote Smart profile
 Mike Hawker at 100 Years of Alaska's Legislature

1956 births
21st-century American politicians
American accountants
Living people
Republican Party members of the Alaska House of Representatives
Politicians from Anchorage, Alaska
People from Manchester, Iowa
University of Northern Iowa alumni